The 2004–05 Montreal Canadiens season was the team's 96th season, 88th in the National Hockey League. However, its games were cancelled as the 2004–05 NHL lockout could not be resolved in time. The other 29 teams did not play either due to the labour dispute.

Schedule
The Canadiens preseason and regular season schedules were announced on July 14, 2004.

|-
| 1 || September 23 || Tampa Bay Lightning
|-
| 2 || September 24 || Toronto Maple Leafs
|-
| 3 || September 26 || Ottawa Senators
|-
| 4 || September 28 || Boston Bruins
|-
| 5 || September 29 || @ Boston Bruins
|-
| 6 || October 2 || Buffalo Sabres
|-
| 7 || October 5 || @ Toronto Maple Leafs
|-
| 8 || October 6 || @ Buffalo Sabres
|-
| 9 || October 9 || @ Ottawa Senators
|-

|-
| 1 || October 13 || @ Ottawa Senators
|-
| 2 || October 16 || Philadelphia Flyers
|-
| 3 || October 19 || Pittsburgh Penguins
|-
| 4 || October 21 || @ Washington Capitals
|-
| 5 || October 23 || Toronto Maple Leafs
|-
| 6 || October 26 || Carolina Hurricanes
|-
| 7 || October 28 || @ Philadelphia Flyers
|-
| 8 || October 30 || Atlanta Thrashers
|-
| 9 || November 3 || @ Florida Panthers
|-
| 10 || November 5 || @ Carolina Hurricanes
|-
| 11 || November 6 || @ St. Louis Blues
|-
| 12 || November 9 || Washington Capitals
|-
| 13 || November 12 || @ Ottawa Senators
|-
| 14 || November 13 || Ottawa Senators
|-
| 15 || November 16 || Boston Bruins
|-
| 16 || November 17 || @ Pittsburgh Penguins
|-
| 17 || November 20 || New York Rangers
|-
| 18 || November 24 || @ New York Islanders
|-
| 19 || November 26 || @ Buffalo Sabres
|-
| 20 || November 27 || Boston Bruins
|-
| 21 || November 30 || Minnesota Wild
|-
| 22 || December 3 || @ New Jersey Devils
|-
| 23 || December 4 || @ Boston Bruins
|-
| 24 || December 8 || @ Florida Panthers
|-
| 25 || December 9 || @ Tampa Bay Lightning
|-
| 26 || December 11 || @ Toronto Maple Leafs
|-
| 27 || December 14 || Tampa Bay Lightning
|-
| 28 || December 17 || @ New Jersey Devils
|-
| 29 || December 18 || New Jersey Devils
|-
| 30 || December 21 || Buffalo Sabres
|-
| 31 || December 22 || @ Buffalo Sabres
|-
| 32 || December 29 || @ Vancouver Canucks
|-
| 33 || December 31 || @ Calgary Flames
|-
| 34 || January 1 || @ Edmonton Oilers
|-
| 35 || January 4 || Pittsburgh Penguins
|-
| 36 || January 6 || @ Boston Bruins
|-
| 37 || January 8 || Florida Panthers
|-
| 38 || January 10 || @ New York Rangers
|-
| 39 || January 11 || Carolina Hurricanes
|-
| 40 || January 15 || Dallas Stars
|-
| 41 || January 17 || @ Nashville Predators
|-
| 42 || January 19 || @ Colorado Avalanche
|-
| 43 || January 22 || Toronto Maple Leafs
|-
| 44 || January 24 || Atlanta Thrashers
|-
| 45 || January 26 || @ Columbus Blue Jackets
|-
| 46 || January 28 || @ Washington Capitals
|-
| 47 || January 29 || New York Rangers
|-
| 48 || February 1 || Boston Bruins
|-
| 49 || February 3 || San Jose Sharks
|-
| 50 || February 5 || Los Angeles Kings
|-
| 51 || February 6 || New York Islanders
|-
| 52 || February 8 || Vancouver Canucks
|-
| 53 || February 10 || @ Boston Bruins
|-
| 54 || February 15 || Philadelphia Flyers
|-
| 55 || February 17 || Edmonton Oilers
|-
| 56 || February 19 || Ottawa Senators
|-
| 57 || February 20 || @ Philadelphia Flyers
|-
| 58 || February 22 || New York Islanders
|-
| 59 || February 24 || Florida Panthers
|-
| 60 || February 26 || Buffalo Sabres
|-
| 61 || February 27 || @ Pittsburgh Penguins
|-
| 62 || March 2 || @ Chicago Blackhawks
|-
| 63 || March 3 || @ Detroit Red Wings
|-
| 64 || March 5 || @ Toronto Maple Leafs
|-
| 65 || March 8 || Washington Capitals
|-
| 66 || March 11 || @ New York Islanders
|-
| 67 || March 12 || Buffalo Sabres
|-
| 68 || March 15 || @ Ottawa Senators
|-
| 69 || March 17 || @ Carolina Hurricanes
|-
| 70 || March 19 || Anaheim Mighty Ducks
|-
| 71 || March 21 || Phoenix Coyotes
|-
| 72 || March 23 || @ Atlanta Thrashers
|-
| 73 || March 24 || @ Tampa Bay Lightning
|-
| 74 || March 26 || Calgary Flames
|-
| 75 || March 28 || @ New York Rangers
|-
| 76 || March 29 || Tampa Bay Lightning
|-
| 77 || March 31 || Toronto Maple Leafs
|-
| 78 || April 2 || @ Toronto Maple Leafs
|-
| 79 || April 4 || New Jersey Devils
|-
| 80 || April 6 || @ Atlanta Thrashers
|-
| 81 || April 8 || @ Buffalo Sabres
|-
| 82 || April 9 || Ottawa Senators
|-

Transactions
The Canadiens were involved in the following transactions from June 8, 2004, the day after the deciding game of the 2004 Stanley Cup Finals, through February 16, 2005, the day the  season was officially cancelled.

Trades

Players acquired

Players lost

Signings

Draft picks
The 2004 NHL Entry Draft was held on June 26 at the RBC Center in Raleigh, North Carolina. It was the last NHL event to take place before the beginning of the lockout which cancelled all the games scheduled for the 2004–05 NHL season.

Montreal selected nine players at the 2004 Draft:

Notes

References

Montreal Canadiens seasons
Montreal
Mon
Montreal Canadiens
Montreal Canadiens